The 2015 Individual Long Track/Grasstrack World Championship was the 45th edition of the FIM speedway Individual Long Track World Championship.

The world title was won by Jannick de Jong of the Netherlands.

Venues

Final Classification

References 

2015
Speedway competitions in Germany
Speedway competitions in the Netherlands
Long
2015 in Dutch motorsport
2015 in German motorsport